Michael Christensen may refer to:

 Michael Christensen (architect) (born 1960), Danish architect, founder of Christensen & Co
 Michael Christensen (racing driver) (born 1990), Danish racing driver
 Michael Færk Christensen (born 1986), Danish racing cyclist
 Michael Christensen (footballer) (born 1983), Danish football player
 Michael Christensen, participant in 2003 of Danish Idols

See also
 Michael Christiansen (1926–1984), British  newspaper editor